Scott Allen Watkins is a former Major League Baseball pitcher.

Sources

Major League Baseball pitchers
Minnesota Twins players
Kenosha Twins players
Nashville Xpress players
Fort Wayne Wizards players
Fort Myers Miracle players
Salt Lake Buzz players
New Haven Ravens players
Omaha Royals players
Oklahoma RedHawks players
Tulsa Drillers players
Iowa Cubs players
Seminole State Trojans baseball players
Colorado Springs Sky Sox players
Baseball players from Oklahoma
Sportspeople from Tulsa, Oklahoma
1970 births
Living people
Oklahoma State Cowboys baseball players